Landauer's principle is a physical principle pertaining to the lower theoretical limit of energy consumption of computation. It holds that an irreversible change in information stored in a computer, such as merging two computational paths, dissipates a minimum amount of heat to its surroundings.

Statement
Landauer's principle states that the minimum energy needed to erase one bit of information is proportional to the temperature at which the system is operating. More specifically, the energy needed for this computational task is given by

where  is the Boltzmann constant. Modern computers use about a million times as much energy per operation.

History
Rolf Landauer first proposed the principle in 1961 while working at IBM. He justified and stated important limits to an earlier conjecture by John von Neumann. For this reason, it is sometimes referred to as being simply the Landauer bound or Landauer limit.

In 2008 and 2009, researchers showed that Landauer's principle can be derived from the second law of thermodynamics and the entropy change associated with information gain, developing the thermodynamics of quantum and classical feedback-controlled systems. 

In 2011, the principle was generalized to show that while information erasure requires an increase in entropy, this increase could theoretically occur at no energy cost. Instead, the cost can be taken in another conserved quantity, such as angular momentum.

In a 2012 article published in Nature, a team of physicists from the École normale supérieure de Lyon, University of Augsburg and the University of Kaiserslautern described that for the first time they have measured the tiny amount of heat released when an individual bit of data is erased.

In 2014, physical experiments tested Landauer's principle and confirmed its predictions.

In 2016, researchers used a laser probe to measure the amount of energy dissipation that resulted when a nanomagnetic bit flipped from off to on. Flipping the bit required 26 millielectronvolts (4.2 zeptojoules).

A 2018 article published in Nature Physics features a Landauer erasure performed at cryogenic temperatures  on an array of high-spin (S = 10) quantum molecular magnets. The array is made to act as a spin register where each nanomagnet encodes a single bit of information. The experiment has laid the foundations for the extension of the validity of the Landauer principle to the quantum realm. Owing to the fast dynamics and low "inertia" of the single spins used in the experiment, the researchers also showed how an erasure operation can be carried out at the lowest possible thermodynamic cost—that imposed by the Landauer principle—and at a high speed.

Challenges
The principle is widely accepted as physical law, but in recent years it has been challenged for using circular reasoning and faulty assumptions, notably in Earman and Norton (1998), and subsequently in Shenker (2000) and Norton (2004, 2011), and defended by Bennett (2003), Ladyman et al. (2007), and by Jordan and Manikandan (2019). Other researchers have shown that Landauer's principle is a consequence of the second law of Thermodynamics and the entropy change associated with information gain.

On the other hand, recent advances in non-equilibrium statistical physics have established that there is no a priori relationship between logical and thermodynamic reversibility. It is possible that a physical process is logically reversible but thermodynamically irreversible. It is also possible that a physical process is logically irreversible but thermodynamically reversible. At best, the benefits of implementing a computation with a logically reversible system are nuanced.

In 2016, researchers at the University of Perugia claimed to have demonstrated a violation of Landauer’s principle. However, according to Laszlo Kish (2016), their results are invalid because they "neglect the dominant source of energy dissipation, namely, the charging energy of the capacitance of the input electrode".

See also
 Margolus–Levitin theorem
 Bremermann's limit
 Bekenstein bound
 Kolmogorov complexity
 Entropy in thermodynamics and information theory
 Information theory
 Jarzynski equality
 Limits to computation
 Extended mind thesis
 Maxwell's demon
 Koomey's law

References

Further reading

External links

 Public debate on the validity of Landauer's principle (conference Hot Topics in Physical Informatics, November 12, 2013)
 Introductory article on Landauer's principle and reversible computing
 Maroney, O.J.E. " Information Processing and Thermodynamic Entropy" The Stanford Encyclopedia of Philosophy.
 Eurekalert.org: "Magnetic memory and logic could achieve ultimate energy efficiency", July 1, 2011

Thermodynamic entropy
Entropy and information
Philosophy of thermal and statistical physics
Principles
Limits of computation